Harry Gould (5 January 1925 – 20 May 2010) was an English footballer, who played as an inside forward in the Football League for Tranmere Rovers and Southport.

References

External links

Tranmere Rovers F.C. players
Northwich Victoria F.C. players
Association football inside forwards
English Football League players
Southport F.C. players
1925 births
2010 deaths
English footballers